British Schools of America, an educational organization founded in 1998, joined the Nord Anglia Education family in 2013. Headquartered in Hong Kong, with a North America regional office in Chicago, Illinois, Nord Anglia Education operates 42 schools with over 34,000 students around the world including 10 schools in the United States located in Washington D.C., Charlotte, Chicago, Houston, Boston, New York, Windermere and Coconut Creek. All Nord Anglia Education Schools in the United States provide a unique combination of the International Baccalaureate and the English National Curriculum.The schools also offer the IB Diploma Programme and the IGCSE as well as US curriculum.

British School of Boston

The British School of Boston opened in September 2000 in Dedham, Massachusetts. In 2004, the school relocated to the Showa Boston campus in the Moss Hill section of Jamaica Plain, Massachusetts. BSB shares a  campus with Showa Women's University satellite campus whose main campus is in Tokyo, Japan. The current headmaster is Paul Wiseman. All teaching staff is recruited directly from the United Kingdom or other international schools.

Accreditation and Professional Associations

The British School of Boston is accredited to offer the International Baccalaureate Diploma Programme  and the International General Certificate of Secondary Education (IGCSE). The school is an active member of the  http://www.ecis.org/(ECIS) and the  https://web.archive.org/web/20110927231350/http://www.cois.org/(CISTA).

Enrollment and Student Profile

The British School of Boston's current enrollment comprises approximately 435 students, with seventy eight nationalities represented in the student body.  The school serves Nursery School to Year 13 (Pre-School to Grade 12).

British School of Chicago, Lincoln Park
British International School of Chicago, Lincoln Park opened in 2001 in Chicago, Illinois on the north side. In 2008, the school relocated to Lincoln Park. The current principal is Mel Curtis. All teaching staff is recruited directly from the United Kingdom or other international schools.

The school is well known in the area for the British International School of Chicago, Lincoln Park Music School, which offers students and members of the community to take individual and group classes.

Accreditation and Professional Associations

British International School of Chicago, Lincoln Park is accredited as a Learning-Focused School. It is also accredited by the Council of International Schools (CIS) and the National Independent Private Schools Association (NIPSA). The school is an active member of the European Council for International Schools (ECIS) and the Council for International Schools in the Americas (CISTA). BSC is also an affiliate member of the Independent Schools Association of the Central States (ISACS).  In 2010, the school was the 4th in the world to achieve "mastering" level in all areas in delivering the International Primary Curriculum.

Student Profile

British International School of Chicago, Lincoln Park serves Nursery to Year 6 (Pre-School to Grade 5).

British American School of Charlotte
The British American School of Charlotte opened in 2004 and is located in the Ballantyne/South Charlotte area. The current headteacher is Adam Stevens. All teaching staff is recruited directly from the United Kingdom or other international schools.  The curriculum includes the International Primary Curriculum, National Curriculum for England, and the International General Certificate of Secondary Education IGCSE.

Accreditation and Professional Associations

The British American School of Charlotte is accredited as a Learning-Focused School. The school is an active member of the European Council for International Schools (ECIS) and the Council for International Schools in the Americas (CISTA).

Enrollment and Student Profile

The British American School of Charlotte's current enrollment comprises approximately 165 students, with eleven nationalities represented in the student body. The school serves Nursery to Year 10 (Pre-School to Grade 9).

British School of Houston
The British School of Houston opened in 2000 and is located west of downtown Houston, Texas. The headteacher is Ann McPhee (acting). All teaching staff is recruited directly from the United Kingdom or other international schools.

Accreditation and Professional Associations

The British School of Houston is accredited to offer the International Baccalaureate Diploma Programme (IBDP) and the International General Certificate of Secondary Education (IGCSE). The school is an active member of the European Council for International Schools (ECIS), the Council for International Schools in the Americas (CISTA), and the Independent Association of Preparatory Schools.

Enrollment and Student Profile

The British School of Houston's current enrollment comprises approximately 870 students, with over forty nationalities represented in the student body. The school serves Nursery to Year 13 (Pre-School to Grade 12).

British School of Washington
The British School of Washington was the first World Class Learning school to be opened by Lesley Stagg in 1998 Washington D.C. In 2008, the school relocated to the Georgetown (D.C.) area.  The headteacher is David Rowsell. All teaching staff is recruited directly from the United Kingdom or other international schools.

Accreditation and Professional Associations

The British School of Washington is accredited to offer the International Baccalaureate Diploma Programme (IBDP) and the International General Certificate of Secondary Education (IGCSE). The school is also accredited as a Learning-Focused School and is an active member of the European Council for International Schools (ECIS), the Council for International Schools in the Americas (CISTA), and the British American Business Council.

Enrollment and Student Profile

The British School of Washington's current enrollment comprises approximately 430 students, with over thirty four nationalities represented in the student body. The school serves Nursery to Year 13 (Pre-School to Grade 12).

References

External links

British international schools in the United States
International schools in the United States